Ernesto Ugeziwe (born 23 July 1990) is a Rwandan radio and television personality, known for his music and entertainment shows mainly on Rwanda Television. (RTV)

Early years 

He was born on 23 July 1990 in Nyarugenge, Kigali City, Rwanda, the seventh and only boy among seven children by a Christian family. He grew up in Karongi district, Western province with his family after the 1994 Genocide against the Tutsi. He completed his secondary studies at ETO Gitarama and the university studies at Kigali Independent University with a degree in science and technology. As a child his dream was to become an actor.

Media career 

Before gaining popularity as a journalist, Ugeziwe earned a living by preparing commercials for major companies. He also played in a boys' scout band.

In 2011, he worked with Radio Isangano fm, one of the community radios in western province where he did entertainment shows while also finishing his university studies.

In 2012 he left Isangano for Radio Flash FM. At Flash FM he presented shows on entertainment and showbiz.

Ugeziwe later in 2013 joined Magi FM, a radio station meant to entertain youth. He was recruited at Magic FM as an entertainment presenter and programme producer.

Ugeziwe then moved to television, working on the shows RTV Mag and YoHits, owned by Rwanda Broadcasting Agency.

Awards 
Ugeziwe's TV show, RTV Mag, was judged the best TV show of the year 2014/2015 by Rwanda Broadcasting Agency.

Other activities 

In 2013 Ugeziwe also worked as the Media and communication chief of East African Promoters, an event company that organises major concerts involving international artists, and organises Primus Guma Guma Super Star (PGGSS), an annual talent competition.

In 2015 Ugeziwe was working on a promotional show on Tigo Rwanda. He then moved to the United States to continue his master's degree in media and communication. After studying journalism at Charlotte State University in North Carolina (USA), Ugeziwe signed on at the Washington-based Voice of America (VOA) as part of an evening showbiz program and news broadcasts.

References

 http://www.umuryango.rw/Imyidagaduro/Miss-Keza-Joannah-mu-rukundo-n-umunyamakuru-Ernesto-bateganya-no-kubana
 http://inyarwanda.com/articles/show/EntertainmentNews/umunyamakuru-ernesto-yerekeje-i-burayi-65137.html
 http://www.izuba-rirashe.com/m-11825-abahanzi-bari-muri-pggss-5-bagiye-gufasha-abanyarwanda-birukanywe-muri-tanzaniya.html
 http://www.kigalitoday.com/imyidagaduro/hanze/Umunyamakuru-Ernesto-yagiye-muri-Amerika-kwiga
 http://www.newtimes.co.rw/section/read/216877/
 http://www.igihe.com/imyidagaduro/article/umunyamakuru-ernesto-winjiye-mu-bakorera-radio-ijwi-rya-amerika-yatangiye

1990 births
Living people
Rwandan radio presenters
Rwandan journalists
Rwandan television presenters
People from Nyaruguru District